Ospedaletto D'Alpinolo is a city and comune in the province of Avellino, Campania, southern Italy.

References 

Cities and towns in Campania